Wespennest (literally translated "wasps nest")  is a bi-annual literary magazine published in Austria. It includes texts and images by authors and artists, presenting themes on specific countries, literature, art theory or politics, along with interviews, polemics, book and theatre reviews and works of photography on 112 pages.

History 

The magazine was founded in 1969 and originally developed as a project by a group of authors from the Vienna 68er-Bewegung.  The twenty-year-old writers Peter Henisch und Helmut Zenker initially founded Wespennest as a publication for their own texts, dissociated from the literary magazine Literatur und Kritik, which they found "too virtuous", and Manuskripte, which they found "too avant-garde". After the founding authors resigned, other writers including Gustav Ernst and Franz Schuh, worked as editors and co-publishers of Wespennest for many years. In the mid-1980s, Josef Haslinger altered the concept of the quarterly magazine. In addition to German-language literature and essays, it began to publish regular translations of foreign authors who were not well known in the German-speaking world. A collaboration was also formed with the European network of cultural journals Eurozine, which Wespennest helped to found.

Walter Famler, the magazine’s current publisher, expanded the magazine’s activities at the beginning of the 1990s to include book publishing, coming out with three to five books a year in the series Edition Literatur, Edition Essay and Edition Film. Founded as a literary magazine, Wespennest now includes works on the humanities and social sciences. It regularly publishes critical essays on topics of contemporary art and film, and coverage of political and social events in and outside Austria. 
The 100th issue, which appeared in September 1995, included further content and design changes by Stefan Fuhrer. Articles appear under the heading Wespennest Portraits, which has included articles on Drago Jančar, Dževad Karahasan, John Mateer and Meg Stuart. The articles aim to maintain a connection between photographs and text.

The magazine is published under a distribution agreement with the Munich-based publishing house C.H. Beck. It aims to provide a literary forum and a critical public for authors, who have included Friedrich Achleitner, Gabriela Adameşteanu, Gennadij Ajgi, Sadik Al-Azm, Les Back, Lothar Baier, Colette Braeckman, Alida Bremer, Rudolf Burger, Mircea Cărtărescu, Peter O. Chotjewitz, Inger Christensen, György Dalos, Jesús Díaz, Ulrike Draesner, Michail Eisenberg, Katarina Frostenson, Arno Geiger, Georgi Gospodinov, Sabine Gruber, Adolf Holl, Nora Iuga, Jaan Kaplinski, Sema Kaygusuz, Navid Kermani, Friederike Mayröcker, Suketu Mehta, Dmi-trij Prigow, Elif Şafak, Warlam Schalamow, Robert Schindel, Burghart Schmidt, Olga Sedakova, Heinz Steinert, Ilija Trojanow, Tomas Venclova, Wolf Wondratschek and others. The forum for European literature has had contributions from Spain, the Netherlands, Greece and Scandinavia, and discusses the literature of Eastern Europe.

Four themed issues are published each year, with occasional special editions, such as those about the jazz composer Franz Koglmann, the poet Friederike Mayröcker and the Art Brut artist Adolf Wölfli.

The magazine was awarded the V.O. Stomps Prize from the city of Mainz in 2003, for "outstanding achievements in small-scale publishing activities".

Editorial board 
Since 2014, Andrea Roedig and Andrea Zederbauer edit the magazine along with Walter Famler, Erich Klein, Jan Koneffke (literature), Tanja Martini («überläufer»), Reinhard Öhner (photos), and Ilija Trojanow (reportage). Thomas Eder is in charge of the book review section. György Dalos (Berlin), George Blecher (New York), Jyoti Mistry (Johannesburg) and Franz Schuh (Vienna) are regular collaborators.

References

External links 

1969 establishments in Austria
Magazines established in 1969
German-language magazines
Literary magazines published in Austria
Quarterly magazines
Magazines published in Vienna